At In Roads is a live performance album by Borbetomagus, released in 1983 by Cluster Project.

Track listing

Personnel 
Adapted from At In Roads liner notes.

Borbetomagus
 Don Dietrich – saxophone
 Brian Doherty – electronics
 Donald Miller – electric guitar, cover art
 Jim Sauter – saxophone

Production and additional personnel
 Ted Goldberg – co-producer

Release history

References

External links 
 

1983 live albums
Borbetomagus albums
P.S.F. Records albums